Mustaffa Kamil Ayub is Malaysian politician from PKR Perak. He was the Vice-President of PKR.

Background 
Mustaffa has experience as an administrator, chief of student and youth, politics and corporate for more than 30 years. He is a Bachelor of Science (Genetics) (Hons) UKM, Diploma in Education (Mathematics & English) UIAM, Diploma in Islamic Finance, IPI and Bachelor of Political Science, UKM.

During his study in UKM in 1986, he is the student leader of UKM.

He was the Assistant of Registrar and Head of Training Department of UIAM, Political Secretary of Minister of Sports and Youth Malaysia, Director of  Perangsang Selangor Berhad Group and Chairman of Academy of Training, Information and Research Selangor.

Started as a student leader of SK Kg. Gajah, he was also the President of Association of Islamic Student, Volleyball Club, President of St. John Ambulance, Chief Supervisor of SMSAH, President of PMUKM, PKPIM, PEPIAT, Chairman of International Conference IIFSO, Exco ABIM Pusat, President of Youth Council of ASEAN, Chairman of Youth Commonwealth Forum, Deputy Chairman of Kongres Rakyat, President of Institut Masyarakat Madani, Director of Yayasan Belia Malaysia and Chairman of Yayasan Saksama Aman.

Early career 
In the human resource and training field, he is the Master Trainer Muslim Student Association of Japan, Master Trainer for Student Leadership Training Programme in Brunei, Master Trainer of Young Executive Leadership Programme in Singapore, and often invited to present papers about leadership in Maldives, The Netherlands, Indonesia, Brunei, Singapura, United Kingdom, Trinidad & Tobago, Taiwan and Mongolia, and also in all kinds of seminar and forum in Malaysia. He is a member of Malaysia Training Association, Just World Trust, National Youth Consultative Council, BOD International Youth Centre and Integrity Malaysia.

Political career 
He was Deputy Chief of Youth wing, General secretary, Vice president of Keadilan, Chairman of Keadilan Kelantan, Terengganu, Sarawak and Perak. He had also contested in 2008 Malaysian general election and 2013 Malaysian general election, but failed to win any seats.

Election results

Books 
He is the writer of 11 books, which are Gerakan Pelajar-Mahasiswa (1991), Menangani  Cabaran (1994), Dinamika Generasi Muda Menangani Cabaran Wawasan 2020 (1995), Leadership Dynamism (1996), Youth Renaissance (1997), Menerajui Perubahan Poltik Malaysia (2001), Masyarakat Madani dan Idealisme Politik (2004), Masa Depan Politik Alternatif (2002), Ahzab Moden dan Masa Depan Islam (2003), Gerakan Subuh (2017) and the latest book Membangun Insan dan Tamadun (2019), and also editor of several books and magazine.

References 

Living people
People's Justice Party (Malaysia) politicians
Year of birth missing (living people)
Members of the Parliament of Malaysia
Members of the Perak State Legislative Assembly